Balayan Bay is a large bay of Luzon Island in the Philippines. It is part of the Verde Island Passage and its entire shore is in the province of Batangas. It is separated from the South China Sea to the west by the Calatagan Peninsula, which has Cape Santiago as its southern point. The Calumpan Peninsula forms the bay's eastern side, that separates it from Batangas Bay.

The following municipalities line the bay from west to east: Calatagan, Balayan, Calaca, Lemery, Taal, San Luis, Bauan, and Mabini.

References

External links
 

Bays of the Philippines
Landforms of Batangas